O'Neil Taylor (born 22 December 1980) is a Caymanian footballer who plays as a midfielder. He has represented the Cayman Islands during a World Cup qualifying match in 2008 and the  2010 Caribbean Championship.

References

Association football midfielders
Living people
1980 births
Caymanian footballers
Cayman Islands international footballers
Scholars International players